Herbert Dugmore (4 August 1909 – 27 October 1974) was a South African cricketer. He played in one first-class match for Eastern Province in 1929/30.

See also
 List of Eastern Province representative cricketers

References

External links
 

1909 births
1974 deaths
South African cricketers
Eastern Province cricketers
Sportspeople from Bulawayo